Newmarket is a hamlet in the parish of Horsley, Gloucestershire, England.

References 

Villages in Gloucestershire
Stroud District